The , established in 1929, is an award presented by the Japanese newspaper Asahi Shimbun and Asahi Shimbun Foundation to honor individuals and groups that have made outstanding accomplishments in the fields of arts and academics and have greatly contributed to the development and progress of Japanese culture and society at large.

The Asahi Prize was created to celebrate the 50th anniversary of the foundation of Asahi Shimbun. It is recognized today as one of the most authoritative private awards.

Prize winners
Past prize winners include the following.

Arts
 Tsubouchi Shōyō, novelist, 1929
 Taikan Yokoyama, artist, 1933
 Jigoro Kano, founder of judo, 1935
 Shimazaki Toson, novelist, 1935
 Ryōhei Koiso, painter, 1939
 Jun'ichirō Tanizaki, novelist, 1948
 NHK Symphony Orchestra, 1951
 Mashiho Chiri, 1954
 Eiji Yoshikawa, novelist, 1955
 Shikō Munakata, artist, 1964
 Jirō Osaragi, writer, 1964
 Akira Kurosawa, film director, 1965
 Haruko Sugimura, actress, 1968
 Ryōtarō Shiba, novelist, 1982
 Ineko Sata, writer, 1983
 Yasushi Inoue, novelist, 1984
 Seiji Ozawa, conductor, 1985
 Osamu Tezuka, manga artist, 1987
 Migishi Setsuko, artist, 1989
 Seichō Matsumoto, novelist, 1989
 Shuhei Fujisawa, novelist, 1993
 Tadao Ando, architect, 1994 (1996 Praemium Imperiale winner) (1997 Royal Gold Medal winner)
 Kenzaburō Ōe, novelist, 1994 (1994 Nobel Prize in Literature)
 Shuntaro Tanikawa, poet, 1995
 Yoji Yamada, film director, 1996
 Donald Keene, writer, 1997
 Yayoi Kusama, artist, 2000 (2006 Praemium Imperiale winner)
 Hayao Miyazaki, film director, 2001 (2002 Academy Award for Best Animated Feature winner)
 Ai Nagai, playwright, 2005 
 Haruki Murakami, novelist, 2006
 Shigeru Mizuki, manga artist, 2008
 Tadanori Yokoo, artist, 2011
 Takarazuka Revue, 2013
 Tatsuya Nakadai, actor, 2013
 Shigeru Ban, architect, 2014
 Taichi Yamada, screenwriter, 2014
 Tōta Kaneko, poet 2015
 Kazushi Ono, conductor 2015
 Moto Hagio, manga artist, 2016
 Jakucho Setouchi novelist, 2017
 Yoko Tawada, writer, 2019
 Haruomi Hosono. bass player, 2020
 Daidō Moriyama, photographer, 2020
 Machi Tawara, poet, 2021

Science
Yoshio Nishina, physicist, 1944
Shinichiro Tomonaga, physicist, 1946 (1965 Nobel Prize in Physics)
Shoichi Sakata, physicist, 1948
Tomizo Yoshida, pathologist, 1951
Kiyoshi Oka, mathematician, 1953
Leo Esaki, physicist, 1959 (1973 Nobel Prize in Physics)
Osamu Hayaishi, biochemist, 1964 (1986 Wolf Prize in Medicine)
Yoshimasa Hirata, chemist, 1965
Chushiro Hayashi, astrophysicist, 1965
Heisuke Hironaka, mathematician, 1967 (1970 Fields Medal)
Setsuro Ebashi, biomedical scientist, 1968 (1999 International Prize for Biology)
Reiji Okazaki, molecular biologist, 1970
Kimishige Ishizaka, immunologist, 1973
Kiyoshi Itô, mathematician, 1977 (2006 Gauss Prize)
Susumu Tonegawa, molecular biologist, 1981 (1987 Nobel Prize in Physiology or Medicine)
Tasuku Honjo, immunologist, 1981 (2018 Nobel Prize in Physiology or Medicine)
Hidesaburo Hanafusa, virologist, 1983
Masaki Watanabe, orthopedic surgeon, 1983
Yasutomi Nishizuka, biochemist, 1985 (1994 Wolf Prize in Medicine)
Motoo Kimura, biologist, 1986 (1992 Darwin Medal)
Kamiokande Project Team (Leader: Masatoshi Koshiba), 1987 (2002 Nobel Prize in Physics)
Masaki Kashiwara / Takahiro Kawai, mathematician, 1987
Hirotsugu Akaike, statistician, 1988
Tadamitsu Kishimoto, immunologist, 1988 (2009 Crafoord Prize)
Tadatsugu Taniguchi, immunologist, 1988
Tomisaku Kawasaki, pediatrician, 1989
Masato Sagawa, Metallurgist, 1990 (2012 Japan Prize)
Goro Shimura, mathematician, 1991
Ryoji Noyori, chemist, 1992 (2001 Nobel Prize in Chemistry)
Masatoshi Takeichi, biologist, 1993
Makoto Kobayashi, physicist, 1994 (2008 Nobel Prize in Physics)
Toshihide Masukawa, physicist, 1994 (2008 Nobel Prize in Physics)
Nobutaka Hirokawa, neuroscientist, 1995
Syukuro Manabe, meteorologist, 1995 (2021 Nobel Prize in Physics)
Sumio Iijima, physicist, 1996
Shigekazu Nagata, molecular biologist, 1997
Super Kamiokande Project Team (Leader: Yoji Totsuka), 1998
Toshio Yanagida, biophysicist, 1998
Seiji Ogawa, physicist, 1999
Shuji Nakamura, material scientist, 2000 (2014 Nobel Prize in Physics)
Isamu Akasaki, material scientist, 2000 (2014 Nobel Prize in Physics) 
Shizuo Akira, immunologist, 2005
Takao Kondo, biologist, 2006
Osamu Shimomura, chemist, 2006 (2008 Nobel Prize in Chemistry)
Shinya Yamanaka, biomedical scientist, 2007 (2012 Nobel Prize in Physiology or Medicine)
Yoshinori Ohsumi, biologist, 2008 (2016 Nobel Prize in Physiology or Medicine)
Hayabusa Mission (Japan Aerospace Exploration Agency), 2010
Kenji Kosaka, psychiatrist, 2013
Kazutoshi Mori, molecular biologist, 2013 (2014 Albert Lasker Award for Basic Medical Research)
Hiroaki Mitsuya, virologist, 2014
Satoshi Ōmura, biochemist, 2014 (2015 Nobel Prize in Physiology or Medicine)
Hiraku Nakajima, mathematician, 2016
Jaw-Shen Tsai, Taiwanese physicist, 2020
Takurō Mochizuki, mathematician, 2020 (2022 Breakthrough Prize in Mathematics)
Keiko Torii, plant scientist, 2021

References

External links
 
Website of the Asahi Shimbun with information on the award winners sorted by year of award 
Website of the Asahi Shimbun with information on the winners from 2001 to 2017 
Website of the Asahi Shimbun with information on the winners from 1971 to 2000 
Website of the Asahi Shimbun with information on the winners from 1929 to 1970 
Website of the Asahi Shimbun with information on the winners from 1929 to recent years and a description of the achievements since 2000 

Academic awards
Awards established in 1929
Visual arts awards
Japanese science and technology awards
1929 establishments in Japan